Riverview Church is a large, contemporary, non-denominational, multi-cultural and multi-generational community of Jesus-followers situated in Burswood, an inner suburb of Perth, Western Australia. The church is led by Senior Minister Steve McCready and Executive Minister Tania Watson and has a multi-site approach with weekend gatherings also held weekly at Joondalup, in the northern suburbs of Perth. Riverview is one of the largest churches in Western Australia, with weekly attendance averaging 3,500 members (including a team of over 1,000 volunteers).

History

Rhema Faith Fellowship 
The church was founded by the first pastor, Brian Baker, who was born in England and with his wife, Valerie Baker, migrated to New Zealand in 1972 and ran various ministries there. They subsequently trained at Rhema Bible Training Center in Tulsa, Oklahoma under Pastor Kenneth E. Hagin, and started the Inner City Faith Fellowship at Holmes Hall in Belmont, a suburb of Perth, on 9 December 1979. The church moved five months later to Brisbane Street, five blocks north of Perth's central business district. Baker was ordained by Hagin in 1980. At this time, the Bakers were assisted by Pastors Mark and Joanne Willhite and Pastors Mike and Randa Moorhead from Kansas City, who returned overseas after helping to establish Faith Christian Academy, which in February 1982 commenced teaching 70 school students from years 1 to 10 within the church's building.

The church changed name to Rhema Faith Fellowship in 1982 and again to Rhema Family Church in June 1985, also moving to its current premises at Thorogood Street, Burswood (then called Victoria Park), which previously operated as a warehouse. The school, renamed Rhema Christian Academy in 1985, had grown to 200 students by the following year and had moved to premises in Colombo Street, across Albany Highway from the church.

A bible school (Rhema Bible Training Centre or RBTC) was opened, and in the spirit of its evangelistic traditions, started churches around Western Australia and Australia, as well as over 100 home groups operating in Perth's suburbs. At its peak in the late 1980s, Rhema claimed to have over 3,200 members at its church in Victoria Park and was the biggest single church in Western Australia.

By 1989, the church also offered a children's ministry during its main service for those up to the age of 15, divided into four age groups.

In April 1989, Brian Baker and his youngest son, Barnaby Baker who was a youth pastor in the church at the time, travelled to the United States and both spoke at a number of churches, mostly in Texas and California. On their return, Brian Baker's wife Valerie Baker who had been a pastor in the church and leader of the ladies ministry had decided to resign from the ministry. On 30 April 1989, Brian Baker announced that he would also resign from the ministry as their marriage had finally failed. Brian Baker then appointed his older son Philip Baker as the pastor and leader of the church. Philip Baker was well known to the congregation as a teacher in many of the main services and Brian Baker believed that the transition would save the church from disintegration after his and Valerie Baker's resignations. Philip Baker was also a graduate of the Rhema Bible Training Center in Tulsa, and had been the pastor of the children's ministry in the church.

Philip Baker instituted a financial management plan for the church to handle mounting debts and liabilities arising from the late 1980s recession, including disbanding the nationwide Rhema branding for churches started by RBTC graduates and loosening the relationship with the school, now renamed Regent College.

Under Philip Baker's guidance in 1991-1992, the church started periodic "Guest Sundays", a mix of dramatic arts and multimedia presentation designed to reach those outside the church, made plans for a television presentation called "Rhema Live" and introduced the slogan "the church for people who don't like church".

Founding of Riverview Church 
In 1997, Philip and Heather Baker established Riverview Church in the same building as the old Rhema fellowship, with a more ecumenical focus than its past incarnation, with a membership base that has grown consistently during the early 2000s. Philip Baker was president of the Australian Christian Churches network and regularly wrote to newspapers and made media appearances representing the charismatic movement's point of view on a range of issues.

The church also expanded to new campuses in Joondalup and Cockburn Central.

Transition of leadership to Haydn Nelson 
In June 2009, Philip Baker suffered a benign brain tumour, which had to be removed. The subsequent operation resulted in complications which meant his recovery time was increased greatly. In November 2010, Pastor Haydn Nelson was named Senior Minister of Riverview Church. Under his leadership, as well as the leadership of Executive Ministers Tim Healy, Karen Wilson and Dorcas White, the church continued to grow.

Two suburban Riverview campuses were re-established as independent churches: Northreach Community Church in Joondalup and the Red Door Community Church in Cockburn Central.

Transition of leadership to Tim Healy 
In April 2017 it was announced to the church community there were some financial challenges and Haydn Nelson resigned from his leadership role of Senior Minister. Tim Healy was appointed as Interim Senior Minister in May 2017 for a period of six months while the corporate board undertook the process to find a new Senior Minister. The position was advertised online, and an external Christian Human Resources consultant was engaged. In October 2017, it was announced by the Riverview Board that Tim and Liezl Healy would be appointed to the positions of Senior Minister and Executive Minister, respectively, in a new chapter for Riverview Church.

Launch of Riverview Joondalup 
In February 2018 the church launched Riverview Joondalup as part of their vision to become a multisite community. This new campus was transitioned from an existing church known as Saints Church with the previous Senior Minister - Andrew Baillie, assuming a role on the Riverview leadership team, and Beau Spencer (Generations Area Leader) moving to the Joondalup Campus Pastor role.

Organisation

Leadership and governance 
The corporate board of Riverview Church is made up of regular attendees of Riverview Church as well as several external members. The board provides governance, ensuring that the Senior Minister and the Executive Team have a clear vision for Riverview Church, and oversees the legal and financial aspects of the ministry in accordance with the constitution and other governance documents. Board members receive no income from the association unless employed in a salaried position.

Riverview Church is audited each year by Anderson Munro & Wyllie. The audited financial statements of the organisation are available to attendees of Riverview Church on request.

Ministries

Riverview Kids
Stylised as 'Riverview K!ds', it exists as a service that runs for children aged 2 months to year 6. A specialist children's ministry team runs these services that are provided at all services.

Riverview Youth
The church's youth group, stylised as 'RVWYTH' (Riverview Youth), Riverview Youth is an environment exclusively for high-school aged students. It meets every Friday of the school term at Riverview Church, and hosts a summer camp annually.

A separate worship team from the church team is run through Riverview Youth, the majority of which are students in the youth group, under guidance from adult worship leaders.

Riverview Children's Foundation 
Riverview Children’s Foundation (RCF) exists to provide options for forgotten children and youth around the world. RCF is partnering with projects in five countries that are dedicated to rescue, protect and empower the most vulnerable children and youth in their societies.

RCF regularly conducts overseas trips for attendees of Riverview Church to participate in its overseas projects.

Riverview Media
The church also broadcasts its services on television, via a program called Riverview TV that currently airs across 54 countries, over various networks.

Riverview Community Services 
Riverview Community Services is the community care arm of Riverview Church and offers practical assistance and community outreach to vulnerable persons in the Perth metropolitan area who are experiencing challenging life circumstances and financial need.

Key personnel 

 Steven McCready - Senior Minister
 Tania Watson - Executive Minister

References

External links
Riverview Church home page

Churches in Perth, Western Australia